Dorothy Sherman Severin AB, AM, PhD, FSA, OBE (born 24 March 1942) is Emeritus Professor of Literature at University of Liverpool and a Hispanist. Her research interests include cancioneros and La Celestina.

In June 2009, she was elected corresponding Fellow of the Real Academia Espanola, a distinction granted to very few foreign academics.

Originally Dorothy Sherman, she was the first wife of explorer and writer Tim Severin.

Professional memberships 
Arts and Humanities Research Council (Advisor to Research Board)
Asociación Hispánica de Literatura Medieval (Executive Committee Member)
Asociación Internacional de Hispanistas (Board Member)
Association of Hispanists of Great Britain and Ireland (Member)
Convivio (Cancioneristas) (Board Member)
HEFCE RAE Sub-Panel (Vice Chair)
Modern Humanities Research Association (Board Member)
Royal Society for the Arts (Member)
Society of Antiquaries of London (Fellow)
Women in Spanish, Portuguese, and Latin-American Studies (WISPS) (Founder Member)

Publications 
 "The relationship between the Libro de Buen Amor and Celestina: Does Trotaconventos Perform a Philocaptio Spell on Dona Endrina?" In: Louise M. Haywood and Louise O. Vasvari eds. A Companion to the Libro de Buen Amor Tamesis pp. 123–27 (2004)
 Del manuscrito a la imprenta en la epoca de Isabel la Catolica. Kassel: Reichenberger (2004)
 "Politica y poesia en la corte de Isabel la Catolica". In: Pedro Pinero eds. Dejar hablar a los textos: homenaje a Francisco Marquez University of Seville pp. 239–48 (2005)
 "Celestina's Audience, from Manuscript to Print" In: Ottavio Di Camillo and John O'Neill eds. Selected Papers from the International Congress in Commemoration of the Quincentennial Anniversary of La Celestina Hispanic Seminary of Medieval Studies pp. 197–205 (2005)
 Religious Parody and the Spanish Sentimental Romance. Newark Delaware: Juan de la Cuesta (2005)
 "15th Century Spanish Literary Conjurations and their Relationship to Lucan's Pharsalia VI." In: Charles Burnett, Jill Kraye, WF Ryan eds. Magic and the Classical Tradition Warburg Institute-Nino Aragno Editore pp. 213–22  (2006)
 "The sepultura de Macias by San Pedro--but which San Pedro?" In: Dru Doherty eds. Medieval and Renaissance Spain and Portugal. Studies in Honor of Arthur L-F Askins Tamesis pp. 301–08 (2006)
 An electronic corpus of 15th-century Castilian cancionero manuscripts. Liverpool/Birmingham: University of Liverpool; SD-Editions (2007) Dorothy Severin, Fiona Maguire, Manuel Moreno, Barbara Bordalejo

References 

Humanities academics
Academics of the University of Liverpool
British Hispanists
1942 births
Living people